The International Henryk Wieniawski Violin Competition (Polish: Międzynarodowy Konkurs Skrzypcowy im. Henryka Wieniawskiego) is a competition for violinists up to age 30 that takes place every five years in Poznań, Poland, in honor of the virtuoso and composer Henryk Wieniawski (1835–1880). The first competition took place in 1935 in Warsaw, 100 years after the birth of its patron, and consisted of two stages. The second, after a gap of 17 years in 1952, and subsequent events were held in Poznań in three stages. In 2001 it was decided that the competition would henceforth be held in four stages.

Candidates shall be qualified for the competition subject to preliminary selection auditions run by Maxim Vengerov and another member of the jury.

The following three statutory prizes shall be awarded in the competition:
First prize: 30,000 Euro and gold medal;
Second prize: 20,000 Euro and silver medal;
Third prize: 12,000 Euro and bronze medal.

Additional prizes include three honorary distinctions of 5,000 Euro and the special extra-statutory prize funded by Maxim Vengerov: 12 individual lessons for one of the competition participants. The first edition of the competition took place in 1935 in Warsaw and drew 160 contestants from 23 countries. The inaugural winner of the competition was France's Ginette Neveu. One of the participants was also Grażyna Bacewicz who received an honorary diploma and was to become a future juror of the competition. The two first prizes were funded by renowned Polish luthier Tomasz Panufnik.

Prizewinners

2022
 I.  Hina Maeda
 II.  Meruert Karmenova 
 III.  Qingzhu Weng 
 Distinction. // Hana Chang &  Jane Hyeonjin Cho &  Dayoon You

2016
 I. / Veriko Tchumburidze
 II.  Bomsori Kim &  Seiji Okamoto 
 III. Not awarded
 IV.  Luke Hsu 
 V. / Richard Lin 
 VI.  Maria Włoszczowska 
 VII.  Ryosuke Suho

2011
 I.  Soyoung Yoon 
 II.  Miki Kobayashi
 III.  Stefan Tarara 
 Distinction.  Erzhan Kulibaev &  Aylen Pritchin &  Arata Yumi

2006
 I.  Agata Szymczewska 
 II.  Airi Suzuki 
 III.  Anna Maria Staśkiewicz 
 IV.  Lev Solodovnikow 
 V.  Maria Machowska 
 V.  Jarosław Nadrzycki 
 VI.  Wojciech Pławner 
 Distinction.  Simeon Klimashevskiy

2001
 I.  Alena Baeva 
 II.  Soojin Han &  Roman Simowic 
 III.  Gaik Kazazian &  Bracha Malkin &  Hiroko Takahashi 
 IV.  Mayuko Kamio 
 V.  Jaroslaw Nadrzycki 
 VI.  Alexandra Wood

1996
 I. Not awarded 
 II.  Reiko Otani 
 III.  Akkiko Tanaka 
 IV.  Łukasz Błaszczyk &  Asuka Sezaki 
 V.  Anna Reszniak 
 VI.  Maria M. Nowak

1991
 I.  Bartłomiej Nizioł &  Piotr Pławner 
 II.  Chie Abiko 
 III.  Reiko Shiraishi 
 IV.  Monika Jarecka 
 V.  Tomoko Yoshimura

1986
 I.  Ewgenij Buszkow 
 III.  Nobu Wakabayashi &  Robert Kabara 
 IV.  Wiktor Kuzniecow 
 V.  Alexander Romanul
 VI.  Hiroko Suzuki

1981
 I.  Keiko Urushihara 
 II.  Elisa Kawaguti 
 III.  Aureli Błaszczok 
 IV.  Seiji Kageyama 
 V.  Iwao Furusawa 
 VI.  Megumi Shimane

1977
 I.  Vadim Brodsky 
 II.  Piotr Milewski &  Michał Wajman 
 III.  Zachar Bron &  Peter A. Zazofsky 
 IV.  Charles A. Linale 
 V.  Hiro Kurosaki &  Anna A. Wódka 
 VI.  Kazuhiko Sawa 
 Awards.  Asa Konishi &  Keiko Mizuno

1972
 I.  Tatiana Grindienko 
 II.  Shizuka Ishikawa 
 III.  Barbara Górzyńska 
 V.  Tadeusz Gadzina &  Graczija Arutunian 
 VI.  Stefan Czermak 
 VII.  Edward Z. Zienkowski

1967
 I.  Piotr Janowski 
 II.  Michał Bezwierchnyj 
 III.  Kaja Danczowska 
 IV.  Eduard Tatewosjan 
 V.  Anatolij Mielnkow 
 VI.  Michał Grabarczyk &  Mincho Minchev

1962
 I.  Charles Treger 
 II.  Oleh Krysa 
 III.  Krzysztof Jakowicz 
 IV.  Izabella Petrosjan 
 V.  Mirosław Rusin &  Henryk Jarzynski &  Priscilla A. Ambrose 
 VI.  Tomasz Michalak

1957
 I.  Roza Fajn 
 II.  Sidney Harth 
 III.  Mark Komissarow 
 IV.  Augustin Leon-Ara 
 V.  Ayla Erduran 
 VI.  Władimir Malinin

1952
 I.  Igor Oistrakh 
 II.  Julian Sitkovetsky &  Wanda Wiłkomirska 
 III.  Blanche Tarjus &  Marina Jaszwili &  Olga Parchomlenko 
 IV.  Emil Kamilarov &  Edward Statkiewicz &  Igor Iwanow &  Henryk Palulis 
 V.  Csaba Bokay

1935
 I.  Ginette Neveu 
 II.  David Oistrakh 
 III.  Henri Temianka 
 IV.  Boris Goldstein 
 V.  Ljerko Spiller 
 VI.  Mary Luisa Sardo 
 VII.  Ida Haendel 
 VIII.  Hubert Anton 
 IX.  Bronislav Gimpel

Laureates by country

See also
 List of classical music competitions
 Grzegorz Fitelberg International Competition for Conductors
 Chopin International Piano Competition
 World Federation of International Music Competitions

References

External links
 Henryk Wieniawski Society – organizer of the competition

Poznań
Music competitions in Poland
Polish awards
Recurring events established in 1935
Violin competitions